Sixto Rovina (10 January 1961 – 7 February 1989) was a Netherlands Antilles international footballer who played as a midfielder. He died after suffering a heart attack in a friendly game against VV Hoogezand.

Career statistics

Club

Notes

References

1961 births
1989 deaths
Living people
Dutch Antillean footballers
Netherlands Antilles international footballers
Dutch Antillean expatriate footballers
Association football midfielders
Eerste Divisie players
Eredivisie players
FC Eindhoven players
FC Groningen players
Expatriate footballers in the Netherlands
Association football players who died while playing
Sport deaths in the Netherlands
RKV FC Sithoc players